Ghatanatti is a village in Athani Taluq and Belgaum district in the southern state of Karnataka, India. The main occupation of the people is Agriculture, mainly growing cane sugar.

Agriculture of Ghatanatti:

The sugarcane cultivation is the main crop in Ghatanatti and grape cultivation. Two Milk dairy and one main Milk supply dairy runs in village. The Cow and Buffalo milk production is the part of Agriculture.

Festivals of Ghatanatti:

The below festivals celebrates in village:
 Sankrati (New year)
 Shree Adiveppa Mutyan Jatre
 Shree Basaveshwar Jatre (Shivaji and basaveshwar Jayanti)
 Shree Chandrashekhar Jatre (Village Festival).
 Shree Maa Durga Devi Jatre ( Gramdevate Jatre)
 Holi festival
 Kar Hunnime
 Nag Panchami
 Shree Ganesh Festival
 Dasara/Navaratri/Vijayadashami festival
 Diwali festival

Association in Ghatanatti:

In Village number of association work for society - Swami Vivekanand, Chatrapati Shivaji, Basaveshwar and So on.

Panchayat:

In Village voting is not conducting for Panchayat commit . Commit will be decided by mutual understanding between each other.

References

Villages in Belagavi district